"Anna Regina" is the third episode of the BBC Two series Wolf Hall. It was first broadcast on 4 February 2015.

Plot summary

In 1531, King Henry VIII pushes his cause of marrying Anne Boleyn by proposing a bill that would make him, and not the Pope, the head of the Church in England. Thomas Cromwell's influence in the king's affairs continues to grow, but he seeks more power.

Cast

Critical reception
"Anna Regina" received positive reviews.   The Daily Telegraph again gave the episode 5/5. Reviewer Tim Martin wrote that "Wolf Hall is getting better, and darker, with each episode," and called it a "stellar political drama, with a thrillingly delicate feel for the weight of words."

References

External links
 
"Anna Regina" at the BBC

Wolf Hall (miniseries) episodes
2015 British television episodes
Cultural depictions of Henry VIII
Cultural depictions of Anne Boleyn
Fiction set in the 1530s